Fred Moore may refer to:
 Fred R. Moore (1857–1943), American editor and publisher
 Fred Moore (attorney), American defense attorney in the Sacco and Vanzetti case
 Fred Moore (Australian footballer) (1890–1971), Australian rules football player
 Fred Moore (English footballer) (fl. 1927), English footballer for Bradford City
 Fred Moore (animator) (1911–1952), American animator who worked for Disney
 Fred Moore (politician) (1920–2017), French soldier, politician, and optician
 Fred Kenneth Moore (1921–1941), American Navy Cross recipient after whom the destroyer USS Moore was named
 Fred Moore (Australian activist) (1922–2022), Australian workers' and human rights activist and author
 Fred Moore (American soldier) (born 1936), first African-American tomb guard for the Tomb of the Unknown Soldier
 Fred Moore (activist) (1942–1997), American activist involved in early PC history
 Fred Moore (boxer) (born 1967), light heavyweight boxer from Minnesota

See also
 Freddy Moore (born 1950), American singer-songwriter
 Frederic Moore (1830–1907), British entomologist
 Frederic Moore (sport shooter) (1851–1926), British sport shooter
 Frederick Moore (disambiguation)